Hüseyin Çimşir (born 26 May 1979) is a Turkish football coach and former player.

Playing career
Çimşir spent most of his playing career at Trabzonspor, where he captained the side from 2006 to 2009. At Trabzonspor, he helped the team to success in the Turkish Cup on two occasions, in 2003 and in 2004. He also had short spells at Sakaryaspor, Antalyaspor, Bursaspor, and Adana Demirspor. He transferred to Bursaspor ahead of the 2009–10 season and won the league title with the club that campaign as Bursaspor became the first club outside Istanbul to win the Süper Lig in 26 years.

He was a Turkey international and won 34 caps for the Turkey national team.

His strengths were in his defensive capabilities. He usually would play in the anchor position, covering the defence and attempting to move the ball onto the midfield. He would rarely venture forward, preferring instead to organise and protect the back line.

Coaching career
Çimşir previously served as manager of Trabzonspor. In 
December 2020, he was appointed as manager of BB Erzurumspor.

Honours 
Trabzonspor
Turkish Cup: 2002–03, 2003–04

Bursaspor
Süper Lig: 2009–10

References

1979 births
People from Araklı
Living people
Association football midfielders
Turkey international footballers
Turkey B international footballers
Turkey under-21 international footballers
Turkish footballers
Trabzonspor footballers
Antalyaspor footballers
Süper Lig players
Bursaspor footballers
Sakaryaspor footballers
Adana Demirspor footballers
Trabzonspor managers
Turkish football managers
Süper Lig managers